Jezebel is a 1938 American romantic drama film released by Warner Bros. and directed by William Wyler. It stars Bette Davis and Henry Fonda, supported by George Brent, Margaret Lindsay, Donald Crisp, Richard Cromwell, and Fay Bainter. The film was adapted by Clements Ripley, Abem Finkel, John Huston, and Robert Buckner, from the 1933 play by Owen Davis Sr.

The film tells the story of a headstrong young Southern woman during the antebellum period whose actions cost her the man she loves.

Plot

In 1852 New Orleans, spoiled, strong-willed belle Julie Marsden is engaged to banker Preston "Pres" Dillard. In an important meeting, Pres is trying to convince the board to invest in railroads, as Northerners are doing, and supporting Dr. Livingstone's plea for measures to prevent another outbreak of yellow fever.

In retaliation for Pres refusing to leave the meeting and accompany her to the last fitting for a ball gown, Julie buys a brazen red satin dress ordered by a notorious woman. At the Olympus Ball, the most important social event of the year, unmarried women are expected to wear virginal white. All of Julie's friends are horrified, but no one can convince her to give up her whim.

At the Olympus Ball, Julie's attire is met with shock and disgust by all present, including the slaves. She begs Pres to take her away, but instead he forces her to dance with him while all the other couples leave the floor. When the orchestra stops playing at the instruction of one of the ball's sponsors, Pres tells the conductor to continue. Pres and Julie finish the dance.

Afterwards, Pres takes his leave of Julie, implicitly breaking their engagement. In a final act of spite, Julie slaps him in the face. Aunt Belle Massey urges her to go after him, but she refuses, stating that he will return to her. Instead, he goes North on business. Julie shuts herself up in her house and refuses to see visitors.

A year later, Pres finally returns, bringing his Northern wife, Amy to a homecoming party in his honor at Halcyon Plantation, Julie's estate. Aunt Belle cannot find Julie in time to warn her. Wearing a luminous white gown, before Pres can stop her, Julie humbles herself and begs for his forgiveness and a return of his love. Then Pres introduces her to Amy.

Julie eggs on her longtime admirer, skilled duellist Buck Cantrell, to quarrel with Pres, but the scheme goes awry. It is Pres's inexperienced brother Ted who is goaded into challenging Buck. In an unexpected twist, Ted kills Buck.

Then, as Dr. Livingstone foretold, a deadly epidemic sweeps through the city. They fight it with cannon and smoke and, believing that yellow fever is highly contagious, a quarantine so rigid that people who try to escape the city are shot. In New Orleans, Pres is stricken and, like all other victims, is to be quarantined in the leper colony on Lazaret Island. Julie goes to Dr. Livingstone's place and nurses Pres for a night and a day. The family arrives, thanks to a pass from the governor. When the wagon comes for Pres, Amy begs to go with him, but Julie tells her that she is not equipped to fight for Pres. She does not know the creole words for food and water, or how to deal with the conditions or the people there. Julie begs to go in her place to try to redeem herself. Before agreeing, Amy asks if Pres still loves Julie. Julie declares that he loves only his wife. Amy blesses them, and Julie accompanies Pres on a wagon loaded with other victims and caregivers.

Cast

 Margaret Lindsay as Amy Bradford Dillard
 Richard Cromwell as Ted Dillard
 Henry O'Neill as General Theopholus Bogardus
 Spring Byington as Mrs. Kendrick
 John Litel as Jean La Cour
 Gordon Oliver as Dick Allen
 Janet Shaw as Molly Allen
 Theresa Harris as Zette
 Margaret Early as Stephanie Kendrick
 Irving Pichel as Huger
 Eddie Anderson as Gros Bat
 Matthew "Stymie" Beard as Ti Bat (credited as Stymie Beard)
 Lew Payton as Uncle Cato
 George Renevant as De Lautruc
 Ann Codee as Mme. Poullard (uncredited)
 Stuart Holmes as Doctor at Duel (uncredited)

Background
The Turner Classic Movies Database states that the film was offered as compensation for Bette Davis after she failed to win the part of Scarlett O'Hara in Gone with the Wind. Despite a radio poll showing Davis the audience favorite for the role in that film, David O. Selznick never seriously considered her for it. Jezebel was her second Best Actress Oscar win after winning for Dangerous three years earlier. This win established her as a leading lady from this point on.

Selznick reportedly hired Max Steiner to score Gone with the Wind (1939) on the strength of his work on Jezebel.

Warner Brothers originally sought to cast Cary Grant to co-star, but the studio ultimately balked at his salary demand of $75,000, and cast Henry Fonda instead.

Reception

Contemporary reviews were generally positive and praised Davis' performance in particular, although some found her character's redemption at the end of the film to be unconvincing. Frank S. Nugent of The New York Times wrote that the film "would have been considerably more effective ... if its heroine had remained unregenerate to the end. Miss Davis can be malignant when she chooses, and it is a shame to temper that gift for feminine spite ... It is still an interesting film, though, in spite of our sniffs at its climax." Variety reported that the film was "not without its charm" and "even completely captivating" at times, but found it detracting that the main character "suddenly metamorphoses into a figure of noble sacrifice and complete contriteness," and described the ending as "rather suspended and confusing." Film Daily called it "a really outstanding screen triumph for Bette Davis. She plays an emotional role that calls for running the gamut of emotions, and she handles the part with consummate artistry." Harrison's Reports called it "Powerful dramatic entertainment ... It is not what one would call cheerful entertainment, and may not appeal to the rank and file, but it should please those who like good acting." John Mosher of The New Yorker wrote, "Something went wrong with 'Jezebel,' possibly nothing more than the plot, and all its rich dressing-up can't make it alive ... no scene quite comes off, and at the end, when the she-devil suddenly turns into a saint and a martyr, one isn't even interested. This Jezebel just seems daffy." The film has scored more positive reviews in later years, and has a 94% rating on Rotten Tomatoes.

Accolades

In 2009, Jezebel was included in the annual selection of 25 motion pictures added to the National Film Registry by the Library of Congress as "culturally, historically or aesthetically" significant, and recommended for preservation.

DVD commentary
In 2006, film historian Jeanine Basinger recorded a comprehensive scene-by-scene commentary as part of the re-issued DVD of the film. In her commentary about Davis, Basinger relates that this film is distinctive in the realm of women's pictures because of Orry-Kelly's brilliant costume designs for the actress. Basinger states that the viewer is compelled to watch Davis in four stylings in particular:  the riding crop/outfit in the beginning of the film, the scandalous scarlet red dress at the Olympus Ball, the virginal white dress she wears when she attempts to woo back Henry Fonda, and finally the cape she dons at the end of the film when she must go to help care for Fonda. In Basinger's opinion, this was the performance at the height of Davis's career and Jezebel is the quintessential American woman's film.

See also
 List of American films of 1938

References
Notes

Bibliography
 .

External links

 Jezebel essay by Gabriel Miller on the National Film Registry website
 Jezebel essay by Daniel Eagan in America's Film Legacy, 2009-2010: A Viewer's Guide to the 50 Landmark Movies Added To The National Film Registry in 2009-10, Bloomsbury Publishing USA, 2011,  pages 56–59

 
 
 
 
 Jezebel review and information in cosmopolis.ch

1938 films
American romantic drama films
American black-and-white films
1938 romantic drama films
Films scored by Max Steiner
Films directed by William Wyler
Films featuring a Best Actress Academy Award-winning performance
Films featuring a Best Supporting Actress Academy Award-winning performance
Films set in New Orleans
Films set in 1852
Films set in 1853
United States National Film Registry films
Warner Bros. films
Films with screenplays by John Huston
American films based on plays
Films with screenplays by Clements Ripley
1930s English-language films
1930s American films